Delmino Albano Magalhães Pereira (born 23 Aug 1967) is a Portuguese former professional road cyclist and the current President of the Portuguese Cycling Federation. Professional from 1989 to 2001, he notably won the Portuguese National Road Race Championships in 1989 and 1997, as well as the Troféu Joaquim Agostinho in 1997. He also rode in the 1994 Vuelta a España, and finished 34th overall.

Major results

1989
 1st  Road race, National Road Championships
 1st Stage 3 Volta ao Alentejo
 3rd Overall Troféu Joaquim Agostinho
 5th Overall Volta a Portugal
1st Prologue
1990
 1st Overall GP do Minho
1st Stages 1 & 2
 1st Stage 1 GP Costa Azul
 2nd Overall Volta ao Algarve
1st Stages 2 & 9
 6th Overall Volta a Portugal
1991
 3rd Overall Grande Prémio Jornal de Notícias
 6th Overall Route du Sud
1992
 1st Prologue Tour du Vaucluse
 3rd Overall Grande Prémio Jornal de Notícias
1st Stage 4
 9th Overall Route du Sud
1993
 2nd Overall Troféu Joaquim Agostinho
1st Stage 5
 3rd Road race, National Road Championships
 8th Overall Volta a Portugal
1994
 2nd Overall Volta a Portugal do Futuro
1st Stage 6
1995
 3rd Overall Volta a Portugal
 9th Overall Volta ao Algarve
1997
 1st  Road race, National Road Championships
 1st  Overall Troféu Joaquim Agostinho
1st Stages 1 & 2
1998
 8th Overall Troféu Joaquim Agostinho
1999
 1st Stage 5 Troféu Joaquim Agostinho
 9th Overall Volta a Portugal
 9th Overall Volta ao Algarve
2000
 1st Stage 3 Grande Prémio Jornal de Notícias
 2nd Overall GP CTT Correios de Portugal
 9th Overall Volta ao Alentejo
2001
 2nd Road race, National Road Championships

References

External links

1967 births
Living people
Portuguese male cyclists
People from Vila Real, Portugal
Sportspeople from Vila Real District